Aleksandr Androshkin (6 July 1947 – 11 January 2010) was a Soviet sports shooter. He competed at the 1972 Summer Olympics and the 1976 Summer Olympics.

References

1947 births
2010 deaths
Ukrainian male sport shooters
Soviet male sport shooters
Olympic shooters of the Soviet Union
Shooters at the 1972 Summer Olympics
Shooters at the 1976 Summer Olympics
Sportspeople from Donetsk